Wolf Larson (born Wolfgang von Wyszecki on December 22, 1959) is a German-Canadian former actor, screenwriter, and producer.

Biography 
Larson was born in West Germany to Gunther and Ingeborg, he has a younger sister. In his teens he worked as a waiter at the Chippendales nightclub.

Filmography

Film

Television

References

External links

1959 births
Living people
Canadian male television actors
German emigrants to Canada